The 1953–54 NBA season was the Celtics' eighth season in the NBA.

Offseason

NBA Draft

Regular season

x = clinched playoff spot

Record vs. opponents

Game log

Playoffs

|- align="center" bgcolor="#ccffcc"
| 1
| March 16
| @ New York
| W 93–71
| Cousy, Sharman (22)
| —
| Bob Cousy (10)
| Madison Square Garden III
| 1–0
|- align="center" bgcolor="#ffcccc"
| 2
| March 17
| Syracuse
| L 95–96 (OT)
| Bob Cousy (32)
| three players tied (10)
| Jack Nichols (10)
| Boston Garden
| 1–1
|- align="center" bgcolor="#ccffcc"
| 3
| March 20
| New York
| W 79–78
| Bill Sharman (26)
| —
| Cousy, Nichols (6)
| Boston Garden
| 2–1
|- align="center" bgcolor="#ffcccc"
| 4
| March 22
| @ Syracuse
| L 85–98
| Bob Cousy (25)
| Jack Nichols (12)
| Bob Cousy (8)
| Onondaga War Memorial
| 2–2
|-

|- align="center" bgcolor="#ffcccc"
| 1
| March 25
| @ Syracuse
| L 94–109
| Jack Nichols (28)
| Jack Nichols (9)
| Bill Sharman (5)
| Onondaga War Memorial
| 0–1
|- align="center" bgcolor="#ffcccc"
| 2
| March 27
| Syracuse
| L 76–83
| Bill Sharman (20)
| —
| Bob Cousy (6)
| Boston Garden
| 0–2
|-

Awards and records
Bob Cousy, All-NBA First Team
Ed Macauley, All-NBA Second Team

References

Boston Celtics seasons
Boston Celtics
Boston Celtics
Boston Celtics
1950s in Boston